Nemacheilus elegantissimus is a species of ray-finned fish in the genus Nemacheilus from Sabah.

Footnotes 
 

E
Fish described in 1992